Xala is a 1973 novel by Ousmane Sembène, that was later translated and published in English in 1976 as part of the influential Heinemann African Writers Series. It is about El Hadji Abdou Kader Beye, a businessman who is struck by impotence on the night of his wedding to his third wife.

It was adapted into a movie, also called Xala (1975) and directed by Sembene.

References 
Xala at www.wmich.edu

1973 novels
Novels by Ousmane Sembène
Novels set in Africa
Senegalese novels adapted into films
African Writers Series
French-language novels

bn:ক্ষালা (উপন্যাস)